Sparrowpit is a small village between Chapel-en-le-Frith and Peak Forest in the High Peak area of the Peak District, Derbyshire, England.

The name is derived from 'spar row pit' from the fluorspar mines.

The village has an active community, including a methodist chapel and village hall.

It is situated at a crossroads where the main road (A623) takes a right-angled bend at the Wanted Inn. From this junction, one minor road takes a different and hillier route to Chapel-en-le-Frith, and another heads for Mam Tor and Castleton by way of the Winnats Pass.

The watershed between rivers running east into the North Sea and west into the Irish Sea runs almost exactly through the village.

Towns and villages of the Peak District
Hamlets in Derbyshire
Chapel-en-le-Frith